The 2014–15 Coupe de la Ligue was the 21st edition of the French league cup competition. The competition was organized by the Ligue de Football Professionnel and was open to the 44 professional clubs in France that are managed by the organization.

Paris Saint-Germain were the reigning champions, having defeated Lyon 2–1 in the previous season's final for a record fourth title. They won their fifth on 11 April, defeating Bastia 4–0 in the final.

First round

First round matches were held over 1 day; 12 of August 2014. The 10 winners secured places in the second round.

Second round

The round featured the 10 winners of the first-round matches, plus Ajaccio and Châteauroux, who were exempt from the first round. The matches were contested on 26 August 2014.

Third round

The round features the 6 winners of the second round matches in addition to 14 Ligue 1 clubs who were not participating in the European competitions. The matches were contested on 28 and 29 October 2014.

Round of 16 

The draw for the Round of 16 of the 2014–15 edition of the Coupe de la Ligue was held on 5 November 2014. The round featured the ten winners of the third round matches and the six Ligue 1 clubs that qualified for European competition in the 2013–14 season. The matches were contested on 16 and 17 December 2014.

Quarter-finals
The draw for the quarter-finals was held 17 December 2014 following the conclusion of the Round of 16 matches. The round featured the eight winners of the Round of 16 matches and were contested on 13 and 14 January 2015.

Semi-finals
The draw for the semi-finals was held on 14 January 2015 following the conclusion of the quarter-finals matches. The round featured the four winners of the quarter-final matches and were contested on 3 and 4 February 2015.

Final

The final was held on 11 April 2015 at the Stade de France, Saint-Denis.

Media coverage
For the seventh consecutive season, the tournament was screened in France by France Télévisions.

See also
 2014–15 Ligue 1
 2014–15 Ligue 2

References

External links
 Official site  

Coupe de la Ligue seasons
France
League Cup